Lalmatia is a small residential area located in the heart of Dhaka, Bangladesh, it is a part of Mohammadpur and located at the south side of Mohammadpur, bordering with Dhanmondi and Sher-e-Bangla Nagar. Known for its narrow streets and red-bricked houses the area is currently experiencing a full-scale modernization with Bungalows being replaced by high-rise buildings having flats and commercial spaces. Three busy roads (Satmasjid road, Old Road number 27 and Mirpur road) surround Lalmatia on three sides. As it has been undergoing huge development works, it is ending up being a wealth concentrated area of Mohammadpur like Iqbal Road, Aurangzeb Road, Babar Road and Shyamoli.

Overview
The township is now becoming a target of the apartment developers and losing its old buildings. It is now being known as the "under-construction township". There had been a recent upsurge from the residents because of the open pits in the middle of streets and un-repaired streets lying in that state for months at a time without being fixed. It is also known for its lush playing grounds and the red earth which is coincidentally the translation to the name "Lalmatia". Its name "Lalmatia" is presumed to have been given for the red earth it contains. It is a very peaceful place and there are many playgrounds that other areas do not have. Lalmatia is divided into a number of blocks named 'A', 'B', ..., 'H'. Though a residential area, there are a number of private companies as well as many commercial enterprises in Lalmatia. There are also a couple of NGOs, hospitals, a number of shops and restaurants and the newest places to hang out.

Education
There are many schools and college and two big universities; one is famous Lalmatia Women's College and another is the Lalmatia Islamic University. There are many other well recognized English Medium Schools like Mangrove, Academia, South Breeze School (Senior Section), Cardiff along with schools boasting great results locally.

Population 
Population of Lalmatia is 28,591 according to the 2011 census.

Security 
There is a good security system in Lalmatia with Ansar force and guards  privately hired by the Lalmatia Residential Society. It is also one of the safest and family-friendly neighbourhoods in Dhaka City.

Gallery

Neighbourhoods in Dhaka